Friends Academy is a Quaker, coeducational, independent, college preparatory school serving students from nursery school through the twelfth grade, located in Locust Valley, New York, United States. The school was founded in 1876 by 78-year-old Gideon Frost for "The children of Friends and those similarly sentimented". The school was originally named Friends College. The school is organized around a lush, grassy quad with buildings surrounding it. Recent additions to the school include the Helen A. Dolan Center (2000), the Kumar-Wang Library (2000), the renovation of the Upper School (2004), the renovation of the Lower School (2010), the construction of the gym and field house (2007), and the renovation of the Middle School (2016).

Students, faculty and staff
There are approximately 750 students from various backgrounds and communities throughout Long Island. There are 224 students in the Lower School, 175 in the Middle School, and 370 in the Upper School. There are 119 full- and part-time teachers; 93 hold master's degrees and 9 hold doctorates.

Athletics
Friends Academy offers a variety of sports for students in grades 7–12. Sports consist of boys and girls basketball, boys and girls soccer, boys and girls cross country, boys and girls track and field, boys and girls lacrosse, boys baseball, girls softball, boys and girls ice hockey, girls field hockey,  boys and girls crew, girls tennis, girls cheerleading, and boys football. Andy Coe (captain of Yale '69 football team) coached football at Friends Academy in 1970. Friends Academy participates in the Nassau County Public High School Athletic Association. Friends Academy is the only school to participate in the Nassau County Public High School Athletic Association as an independent school. Despite playing in a larger conference, Friends Academy has won several Regional and State titles in different sports in recent years. FA has won State Championships in Boys Basketball ('10, '11), Boys Soccer ('09, '10, '11,'13), Girls Soccer ('12), Women's rowing ('06, '08, '09, '10) and Regional Titles in Girls Field Hockey ('12), Girls Basketball ('11).

Arts
Friends Academy offers a wide variety of arts courses for students in grades K-12. Music, Dance, Visual and Digital Art, and Theater are required parts of the curriculum for students through the 8th grade. In the high school, a wide variety of courses are offered as electives. The Visual Arts program has a working dark room and a new digital media lab. The Music Department has a number of performing groups, including wind ensemble, orchestra, vocal ensemble, chamber choir, two middle school jazz bands and a high school jazz band. The Theater and Dance department operates in a 400-seat proscenium theater. There is a working scene shop. The curriculum includes dance, acting, playwriting, and technical theater. The school produces four productions each school year.

Quaker Values

Friends Academy has been teaching students Quaker Values since 1876. Friends Academy believes that in teaching Quaker Values, students will mold their minds and personalities to match the very values that they teach. Quaker Values mainly reflect on truth, morality, and conscience as believed by the Quakers themselves. To uphold the tradition of Quaker Values, the students and faculty of Friends Academy attend the Matinecock Meeting House weekly to attend "Meeting for Worship", a traditional Quaker tradition where the students and faculty sit silently to reflect.

Notable people

Alumni
Alexandra Ansanelli, ballet dancer
Franklin A. Coles, lawyer
Chuck Cooperstein, radio presenter
J. P. Foschi, football player
Heather Lende, author
Renauld Williams, football player
 Frank Posillico, Dry January inventor

Faculty
William W. Cocks, politician
Franklin A. Coles, lawyer

External links
Friends Academy Web Site

References
Notes

Educational institutions established in 1876
Quaker schools in New York (state)
Glen Cove, New York
Schools in Nassau County, New York
Private high schools in New York (state)
Private middle schools in New York (state)
Private elementary schools in New York (state)
Preparatory schools in New York (state)
1876 establishments in New York (state)